Pandit Kushal Das, born in Kolkata in 1959, is an Indian classical sitar and surbahar player.

Early life
Kushal was born in a musical family in Kolkata. His grandfather Bimal Das was an esraj player and his father and uncle were both sitarists. His father Sailen Das was a disciple of Lakhsman Bhattacharya and Ravi Shankar. His uncle Santanu Das was a disciple of Ali Akbar Khan.

He started his training under the guidance of his father and uncle. Later he received training from Sanjoy Bandopadhyay and from Ajoy Sinha Roy (a disciple of Allauddin Khan) and took vocal lessons from Manas Chakraborty and Ramkrishna Basu.

Career
Kushal has participated in many concert festivals in India and abroad, including:
 The Doverlane Music Conference (Kolkata)
 ITC-SRA Sangeet Sammelan (Kolkata)
 Swami Haridas Festival (Delhi)
 Bengal Classical Music Festival (Dhaka)
 Philharmonie (Paris)
 Darbar (Queen Elizabeth Hall, UK)
 Theatre de la Ville (Paris)

He is a top-grade musician at All India Radio and Doordarshan.

Discography

Raga – Bilaskhani Todi & Sohini from “Ocora Radio France”(France).
Raga – Desh & Mishra Pahadi from “Peshkar” (Germany).
Raga – Aabhogi & Sindhu Bhairavi from “Mavas Music” (India).
Raga – Marwa (Sur-Bahar) from “Ocora Radio France” (France).
Raga – Kaushi kanada & Jhinjhoti from “Rhyme Records” (U.S.A).
Raga – Malkauns, Gorakh Kalyan & Bharavi from “Sumani” (U.S.A).
Raga – Marwa (Sitar) from “India Archive Music” (U.S.A).
The Divine Soul-Raga – Ahir Bhairav, Bageshree & Folk Tune from “Bihaan Music” (India).
Double CD [A] Raga- Mishra Shivaranjani, Mand, Mishra Kafi & Madhyam Se Bhairavi. [B] Raga- Nat Bhairav from “TIM International Music Company” AG, Pastels (Germany).
Essence of time – 11 Ragas from “Rhyme Records” (U.S.A). 
Bandishana – from “Bihaan Music”

References

Sitar players
Surbahar players
Hindustani instrumentalists
String musicians
Musicians from Kolkata
Recipients of the Sangeet Natak Akademi Award